Gilbert School District or Gilbert Schools may refer to:
 Gilbert Public School District - Arizona
 Gilbert Community School District - Iowa